Shalili-ye Kuchek (also Romanized as Shalīlī-ye Kūchek and Shalīlī-ye Kūchak; also known as Shalīlī-ye Pā’īn) is a village in Miyan Ab-e Shomali Rural District, in the Central District of Shushtar County, Khuzestan Province, Iran. At the 2006 census, its population was 175, in 35 families.

References 

Populated places in Shushtar County